Essy Persson (born Essy Ingeborg Vilhelmina Persson, 15 June 1941 in Gothenburg, Sweden) is a Swedish film actress most noted for her role in the sexploitation film I, a Woman.

Career
Persson made her film debut as the lead in Mac Ahlberg's Danish-Swedish erotic film Jeg - en kvinde (1965) which became the surprise box-office hit I, a Woman (1966) for Radley Metzger in the United States. She appeared in the German film Das Rasthaus der grausamen Puppen (1967) and in Mission Stardust (1967), and then Metzger hired Persson for a title character in his 1968 French film Therese and Isabelle about a lesbian sexual affair between two schoolgirls. She later appeared in the 1970 horror film Cry of the Banshee, and in 1971 in Want So Much To Believe. Persson performed in roles on two Swedish television series and then left acting.

Education
After retiring from acting, Persson studied art at Konsthögskolan Valand and Konstfack from 1981 to 1984 and became a visual artist.

References

External links 
 

1941 births
Living people
People from Gothenburg
Swedish film actresses